Behind Masks is a 1921 American silent drama film directed by Frank Reicher. It was written by Kathryn Stuart based upon the 1909 novel Jeanne of the Marshes by E. Phillips Oppenheim. The film stars Dorothy Dalton, Frederick Vogeding, William P. Carleton, Julia Swayne Gordon, Gladys Valerie, and Kempton Greene. The film was released on July 24, 1921, by Paramount Pictures.

A copy of the film is in the Library of Congress, but is incomplete.

Cast 
Dorothy Dalton as Jeanne Mesurier
Frederick Vogeding as Andrew Bourne
William P. Carleton as Major Nigel Forrest
Julia Swayne Gordon as Madame Ena Delore
Gladys Valerie as Kate Cansard
Kempton Greene as Cecil Bourne
Lewis Broughton as Ronald Engleton
Alex Kaufman as Maurice Bresnault

References

External links 

 
Stills at silenthollywood.com

1921 films
1920s English-language films
Silent American drama films
1921 drama films
Paramount Pictures films
American black-and-white films
American silent feature films
Films directed by Frank Reicher
1920s American films